The 1907–08 season is the 34th season of competitive football by Rangers.

Overview
Rangers played a total of 37 competitive matches during the 1907–08 season. The side finished third in the league, five points behind champions Celtic, after winning 21 of the 34 matches.

The Scottish Cup campaign was ended at the hands of the league champions after a 2–1 home defeat. Rangers had drawn with Falkirk away and won the replay en route to the second round.

Results
All results are written with Rangers' score first.

Scottish League Division One

Scottish Cup

Appearances

See also
 1907–08 in Scottish football
 1907–08 Scottish Cup

Rangers F.C. seasons
Rangers